17231 / 32 Narasapuram–Nagarsol Express is a Express train belonging to Indian Railways South Central Railway zone that runs between  and Nagarsol in India.

Service 
It operates as train number 17231 from Narasapuram to Nagarsol and as train number 17232 in the reverse direction, serving the states of Andhra Pradesh, Telangana & Maharashtra.

Coaches

The 17231 / 32 Narasapuram–Nagarsol Express has one AC 2-tier, two AC 3-tier, 10 sleeper class, four general unreserved & two SLR (seating with luggage rake) coaches. It doesn't carry a pantry car.

As with most train services in India, coach composition may be amended at the discretion of Indian Railways depending on demand.

Routeing

Traction
As this route is going to be electrified, a Gooty-based diesel WDP-4D loco pulls the train to its destination.

References

External links
17231 Narasapuram Nagarsol Express at India Rail Info
17232 Nagarsol Narasapuram Express at India Rail Info

Express trains in India
Rail transport in Andhra Pradesh
Rail transport in Telangana
Rail transport in Maharashtra